Euel Box (December 31, 1928 - February 28, 2017) was an American music producer, composer, arranger, and trumpeter who wrote major film scores and radio jingles for major markets.

Early years

College
Box was born in Georgetown, Texas. He studied composition at the University of North Texas College of Music in the 1950s and earned a Bachelor of Music Degree in June 1951. and continued post-graduate studies in composition through the early 1950s.  One of his composition teachers was Violet Archer, resident composer.  He was classmates with undergraduate student composer Larry Austin, Eloy Fominaya and graduate students Robert Gauldin and Clifford Shipp.  Before studying at North Texas, Box spent his first two years of college (1948–49 & 1949–50) at Southwestern University.

Post college
Box played trumpet in the United States Marine Band; produced music (composed, arranged, recorded, conducted) for major radio markets in the North America, London, Luxembourg, and Australia.  He composed film music for Braniff International Airways, Dr. Pepper, Buick, the United States Navy, Haggar Slacks, Zale Corporation, Texas Instruments, LTV Aerospace, and Bell Helicopter.

Songwriter
Box was a songwriter for several films, including Benji, For the Love of Benji, The Double McGuffin, Hawmps!, and Oh Heavenly Dog.  He recorded and conducted  for various artists including Stevie Wonder, Boz Scaggs, Glen Campbell, Lou Rawls, Charlie Rich, and Chet Atkins.  As a recording artist, he had 2 albums.  In 1974, Euel, as composer, and his wife, Betty, as lyricist, received a Golden Globe Award for Best Original Song — "I Feel Love" — from the film Benji.  The song also earned the two a 1974 Academy Award nomination in the same category — Best Original Song.  In that film and other projects, his chief collaborators were Betty Box and Joe Camp.  His songs included, "I Feel the Love," "Sunshine Smiles," "Multiplicity," "Live for Today," and "Somebody Who Really Cares."

Family
Box married Betty Ruth McCrary and had three children.

Film scores
 1974 — Benji
 "I Feel Love"
 1976 — Hawmps!
 1977 — Charge of the Model T's
 1978 — For the Love of Benji
 1978 — Benji's Very Own Christmas Story
 "Multiplicity" ("I Am What People Think of Me")
 1979 — The Double McGuffin
 1980 — Oh Heavenly Dog
 1987 — Benji the Hunted

Awards
Benji earned Euel Box and his wife, Betty, a 1975 nomination for an Oscar and won a Golden Globe Award for Best Song From a Motion Picture.  The award-winning song was "I Feel Love." Euel wrote the music and Betty wrote the words.  Betty also studied music at North Texas, graduating in 1952 and, with Euel, started college at Southwestern University in 1948–49.

Jingles
 "Frito Twist/How To Twist" — advertising promotion for Frito-Lay. "Frito Twist/How to Twist" was recorded in Dallas, Texas, by the PAMS Jingle Studio. "Frito Twist/How to Twist," Fritos promo 45rpm (1962)
  produced by PAMS, composed by Euel Box, et al.

References

External links
 
 Dallas jazz artist, Roger Boykin, interview mentioning Box
 PAMS story
 Photos from PAMS
 Story of the jingle, My Home Town, by Euel Box

1928 births
2017 deaths
American film score composers
American male film score composers
21st-century classical composers
People from Georgetown, Texas
University of North Texas College of Music alumni
Golden Globe Award-winning musicians
21st-century American composers
21st-century American male musicians